Offspring is a fictional comic book superhero in the DC universe. He is the son of Plastic Man, but did not inherit his powers of elasticity, instead gaining them from a watered down version of the acid that granted the original Plastic Man his powers. 

Prior to his debut, the cartoon series The Plastic Man Comedy/Adventure Show featured a character called Baby Plas.

Character biography

Kingdom Come
Offspring's first appearance was in a one-shot issue of the same name, a spin-off of the miniseries The Kingdom. His outfit was a predominantly white all-in-one, with black areas laid out in a similar hexagon/pentagon design to a classic 32-panel soccer ball; his hair also had a hexagonal edge to its cut.

Offspring later appeared in the final issue of The Kingdom miniseries, teamed with Kid Flash, Nightstar, and Ibn al Xu'ffasch to attempt to save the timestream from Gog. In this version he is named Ernie O'Brian. He is treated as a joke professionally and personally by his friends, family, and even foes. However he learns to accept his place on the team as the funny member. His relationship with his dad is close and happy; his girlfriend, Micheline, is unhappy with the lack of respect his goofy behavior is causing.

Mainstream continuity
Although Offspring did not exist in the then-current DC continuity, it was revealed in the pages of JLA that Plastic Man has a son named Luke "Loogie" McDunnagh – his illegitimate child by "Angel" McDunnagh – who has powers greater than his own, with the ability to easily change his color and mass as well as his shape. He initially appeared when Plastic Man asked Batman for his help in scaring the kid straight after he fell in with a gang, Plastic Man admitting in the process that he ran away from Luke's mother after getting over the irony of a rubber man accidentally getting someone pregnant because he was afraid of turning out like his own father. Although Batman subsequently intimidated Luke into leaving the gang and going back to his mother, he noted during a conversation with Plastic Man that he was disappointed in the other man because he had always thought that he would be the best father of the League as he believed Plastic Man would show his children that he loved them rather than just telling them, and advised him to consider getting back in touch with his son later.

After the Obsidian Age storyline saw Plastic Man spend three thousand years scattered across the ocean floor as crumbs until the League of the present were able to stick him back together, he took time off to be with Luke, even mentally 'programming' himself to forget his heroic identity and powers, but Luke and Batman convinced him to go back to action when the Martian Manhunter regressed to a 'Burning Martian' identity as the telepathy-immune Plastic Man was the only person capable of opposing him in a fight.

Offspring appears briefly in Teen Titans vol. 3, #34, and is shown that he served as a member of the Titans during the one year jump. The character wears a white costume with red goggles, a costume similar to that of The Kingdoms Offspring. In Geoff Johns's script for Teen Titans #34, it is revealed that he is indeed Plastic Man's son, Luke. Additionally, in Teen Titans #38, a photograph is displayed showing Offspring and Plastic Man next to each other.

In 52 Week 35, Offspring appears, recovering from overstretching after saving twenty members of Lex Luthor's "Everyman" hero groups. Lex had deactivated their powers, causing dozens to fall from the sky. During his appearance he is called "Ernie" by Plastic Man, not Luke. In Week 40, he assists Steel in launching an attack on Lexcorp when Natasha is captured by Luthor. He's later involved with the storyline of World War III. He tries to defeat the insane Black Adam by grasping his brain from the inside; this plan fails. He is able to recover fast, later joking with his father about the lack of humor of his superpowered foe.

In Countdown to Mystery it is revealed that Ernie is his middle name, and Luke his first name, as Offspring criticizes his father for preferring to call him Ernie, a name with which the young hero is less than enamored.

Offspring is later one of teen heroes captured and brainwashed into fighting at the Dark Side Club. After being rescued by Miss Martian and Ravager, Offspring is offered a spot on the Teen Titans line-up by Wonder Girl. Like most of the other survivors, he declines. During Superboy-Prime's attack on Titans Tower, Offspring appears as one of the former Titans who arrives to help fight him off.

In the pages of the Terrifics, Lee is reintroduced with roughly the same powers and personality, living with his birth mother Angel. He is reluctant and angry at his father for not meeting him for years (as Plastic Man was trapped in his egg form), but relents after the two play a game of basketball and he is given a ride in the Batmobile. He then joins the Teriffics, wearing the costume and codename of Offspring.

Powers and abilities
Offspring has powers similar to Plastic Man, but they are not the same. When Luke was little, he drank a non-identical version of the acid that gave his father elastic properties, thus giving him abilities even greater than Plastic Man.

Other versions
 The 1966-1968 Plastic Man comic book series starred Eel O'Brian, Jr. as the new Plastic Man. Issue #7 reveals that he was born as the non-super powered son of Plastic Man and an unnamed brunette wife. As a toddler, he drank the same acid that had given his father super powers. As an adult, he became the new Plastic Man and was romantically involved with Micheline "Mike" DeLute III (who would later re-appear as the girlfriend of Offspring in the Kingdom Come continuity). During the course of the series, Eel Jr. teamed with the Inferior Five, which established the continuity of this series on Earth-Twelve.

In other media
Television
 Offspring, named Baby Plas''', appears in the second season of The Plastic Man Comedy/Adventure Show. This version was born with the same powers as his father and is cared for by series original character and Plastic Man's sidekick Hula-Hula.
 Offspring, again named Baby Plas, appears in the Batman: The Brave and the Bold episode "Long Arm of the Law!". This version is the son of Plastic Man and his wife Ramona, and cared for by Plastic Man's best friend Woozy Winks. Like the prior version of Baby Plas, he inherited his father's stretching powers.

Miscellaneous
Luke McDunnagh appears in the Injustice: Gods Among Us'' prequel comic. This version is the estranged son of Plastic Man, whose superheroics leave him absent for most of Luke's life, and is a member of a terrorist group working against Superman's Regime. After being captured and incarcerated in an underwater, maximum security Regime prison, Luke and the other prisoners are freed by Plastic Man.

References

External links
 Offspring at DC Database
 Offspring at Comic Vine

Comics characters introduced in 1999
Characters created by Frank Quitely
Characters created by Mark Waid
DC Comics metahumans
DC Comics superheroes 
DC Comics characters who are shapeshifters
Fictional characters who can stretch themselves